DYAN-TV (channel 29) is a television station in Metro Cebu, Philippines, serving as the Visayas flagship of the One Sports network. It is owned by Nation Broadcasting Corporation; TV5 Network, Inc., which owns TV5 outlet DYET-TV (channel 21), operates the station under an airtime lease agreement. Both stations share studios at the TV5 Complex, Capitol Road, Camp Marina, Brgy. Kalunasan, Cebu City, while DYAN-TV's analog and digital transmitters are located atop Mount Busay.

See also
 One Sports
 List of One Sports stations

One Sports (TV channel) stations
Television stations in Cebu City
Television channels and stations established in 2001